Data Mining and Knowledge Discovery is a bimonthly peer-reviewed scientific journal focusing on data mining published by Springer Science+Business Media.  It was started in 1996 and launched in 1997 by Usama Fayyad as founding Editor-in-Chief by Kluwer Academic Publishers (later becoming Springer). The first Editorial provides a summary of why it was started.

Academic status 
Since its founding in 1997, this journal has become the most influential academic journal in the field. Each year, it currently publishes about 60 articles in six issues. It has one of the highest index ratings and is considered authoritative academically.

Editors in chief
The following individuals have served as editor-in-chief of the journal:

2015–present: Johannes Fürnkranz
2005–2014: Geoffrey I. Webb
1997–2004: Usama Fayyad, Heikki Mannila 
2000–2004 with Raghu Ramakrishnan
1997–1998 with Gregory Piatetsky-Shapiro

References

External links 
 
 Data Mining and Knowledge Discovery at DBLP Bibliography Server

Computer science journals
Data mining
Springer Science+Business Media academic journals
Publications established in 1997
English-language journals
Bimonthly journals